The Bayer designation σ Gruis (Sigma Gruis) refers to 2 distinct star systems in the constellation Grus:

 σ1 Gruis
 σ2 Gruis

Grus (constellation)
Gruis, Sigma